The King's Case Note is a 2017 South Korean comedy film directed by Moon Hyun-sung, starring Lee Sun-kyun and Ahn Jae-hong.

Plot
A king and his archivist search for the truth behind a crime that threatens the stability of the kingdom.

Cast
Lee Sun-kyun as King Yejong 
Kang Chan-hee as young King Yejong 
Ahn Jae-hong as Yoon Yi-seo 
Kim Hee-won as Nam Gun-hee 
Kyung Soo-jin as Sun-hwa 
Jung Hae-in as Heuk-woon 
Joo Jin-mo as Jik Je-hak 
Jang Young-nam as Soo-bin
Park Hyung-soo as Officer
Shim Wan-joon as Fisherman
Kim Eung-soo as First vice-premier 
Park Jung-min as Crown Prince Ui-kyung (special appearance)

References

External links

2017 films
2010s adventure comedy films
South Korean adventure comedy films
South Korean historical comedy films
CJ Entertainment films
Films based on manhwa
2017 comedy films
2010s South Korean films
2010s Korean-language films